Clifton, Oregon may refer to:

Clifton, Clatsop County, Oregon, an unincorporated community
Clifton, Hood River County, Oregon, an unincorporated locale